The anthem for Lara State, Venezuela, has lyrics written by Juan Bautista Oviedo; the music was composed by Pedro Istúriz.

Lyrics in Spanish Language

Chorus 
Gloria al pueblo mil veces altivo
que ha sabido la historia ilustrar;
indomable, pujante en la guerra,
y a la ley respetuosa en la paz. 

I 
Cuando el grito sublime de Patria
en el mundo vibró de Colón,
al sonar el clarín de los libres,
que a sus hijos llamaba, escuchó.

II 
Procedidos del Dios de Colombia
sus guerreros al campo lanzó
y con Lara, Jiménez y Torres,
hizo trizas el yugo español.

III 
Pueblo noble, que sabe ser grande
cuando así lo reclama el honor.
Quiera el cielo que siempre sus hijos
rindan culto ferviente a la unión. 

IV 
Que Pomona le brinde sus dones,
paz y dicha la diaria labor,
Y que el faro triunfal del progreso
Ilumine su vasta región.

See also
 List of anthems of Venezuela

References

Anthems of Venezuela
Spanish-language songs